Athysanus is a genus of leafhoppers belonging to the family Cicadellidae.

The species of this genus are found in Eurasia and America.

Species:
 Athysanus acuminatus Baker
 Athysanus alpinus Ball

References

Cicadellidae
Cicadellidae genera